Aliaksei Likhacheuski (born 28 June 1990) is a Belarusian sabre fencer, team silver medallist at the 2011 World Championships in Catania. He took part in the team event at the 2012 Summer Olympics, where Belarus ended 7th.

References 
 
  (archive)
 
 
 

1990 births
Living people
Belarusian male sabre fencers
Sportspeople from Brest, Belarus
Olympic fencers of Belarus
Fencers at the 2012 Summer Olympics
21st-century Belarusian people